Daniel Gregory Feuerriegel (born 29 October 1981) is an Australian actor who is based in Los Angeles, California, United States. He has acted in a number of Australian television series and first came to international notice with his role as a gladiator recruit "Agron" in the series Spartacus: Blood and Sand, Spartacus: Vengeance and Spartacus: War of the Damned. Since June 2021, he has appeared on the NBC Daytime soap opera, Days of Our Lives as EJ DiMera.

Biography
In 1998, Feuerriegel graduated from Villanova College, a Catholic college located in the Brisbane suburb of Coorparoo. He studied acting at the Queensland University of Technology in Brisbane. He graduated in 2002.

Career
 He featured in the 2005 controversial short Boys Grammar which also starred Jai Courtney and Adam J. Yeend.
 He also joined the cast of Small Claims: White Wedding in 2005.
 In 2006 he appeared in Burke & Wills and the short film True, the same year he starred as a recurring character on the hit series McLeod's Daughters where he played Leo Coombes for five episodes, and also appeared in the series Stupid Stupid Man where he played Kim in the episode "The Reunion".
 He joined the cast of Between the Flags (short film) in 2007.
 In 2008 he appeared in a recurring role on the hit series Home and Away where he played the journalist Gavin Johnson. the same year he guest starred in an episode of The Strip, along with Aaron Jeffery.
 In 2009 he played Brendan in the Australian series All Saints, earlier, in 2006 he played Cameron "Indy" Jones in the series.
 In 2010 he played Agron, a gladiator recruit, in the Starz hit series Spartacus: Blood and Sand. Feuerriegel continued this role in 2012 through the third season of the show, entitled Spartacus: Vengeance, and the show's fourth and final season, entitled Spartacus: War of the Damned, in 2013.
In 31 March 2021, it was reported that he would be taking over the role of EJ DiMera in NBC's Days of our Lives, and would make his debut in mid-2021. On 21 May it was confirmed that he was cast in the role, and would make his debut on 9 June.

Filmography

Television

Theatre

References

External links
 

1981 births
Australian expatriate male actors in the United States
Australian male television actors
Living people
People from Brisbane
People educated at Villanova College (Australia)
Queensland University of Technology alumni